Teich is a surname. Notable people with the surname include:

Albert Teich (1929–2010), American lawyer and politician
Curt Teich (1877–1974), American publisher
Frank Teich (1856–1939), German-born American sculptor, stone carver, and businessman
Malvin Carl Teich (born 1939), American physicist and computational neuroscientist
Mikuláš Teich (1918–2018), Slovak-British historian of science
Nelson Teich (born 1957), Brazilian oncologist, health consultant and entrepreneur